Cavasteron is a genus of spiders in the family Zodariidae. It was first described in 2000 by Baehr & Jocqué. , it contains 12 species, all from Australia.

Species
Cavasteron comprises the following species:
Cavasteron agelenoides Baehr & Jocqué, 2000
Cavasteron atriceps Baehr & Jocqué, 2000
Cavasteron crassicalcar Baehr & Jocqué, 2000
Cavasteron exquisitum Baehr & Jocqué, 2000
Cavasteron guttulatum Baehr & Jocqué, 2000
Cavasteron index Baehr & Jocqué, 2000
Cavasteron lacertae Baehr & Jocqué, 2000
Cavasteron margaretae Baehr & Jocqué, 2000
Cavasteron martini Baehr & Jocqué, 2000
Cavasteron mjoebergi Baehr & Jocqué, 2000
Cavasteron tenuicalcar Baehr & Jocqué, 2000
Cavasteron triunguis Baehr & Jocqué, 2000

References

Zodariidae
Araneomorphae genera
Spiders of Australia